Charles Francis Buck (November 5, 1841 – January 19, 1918) was a U.S. Representative from Louisiana.

Life
Born in Durrheim, Grand Duchy of Baden, Germany, Buck immigrated to the United States in 1852 with his parents, who settled in New Orleans, Louisiana. He graduated from the high school of New Orleans in 1861, and then attended Louisiana State Seminary of Learning & Military Academy near Pineville, Louisiana.

Turning to the law as career, Buck studied further, was admitted to the bar in 1867, and commenced practice in New Orleans, Louisiana. He served as member of the school board of New Orleans for many years and was city attorney  from 1880 to 1884.

Buck was elected as a Democrat to the Fifty-fourth Congress (March 4, 1895 - March 4, 1897). He declined to be a candidate for re-election in 1896, resuming the practice of law. He was an unsuccessful candidate for mayor of New Orleans in 1896 and again 1904. He served as member of the supreme court board of examiners for admission to the bar 1898-1900.

Buck died in New Orleans, Louisiana, January 19, 1918, and was interred in the Metairie Cemetery.

References

1841 births
1918 deaths
Foreign Confederate military personnel
Confederate States Army officers
German emigrants to the United States
Louisiana State University alumni
Politicians from New Orleans
People from Tangipahoa Parish, Louisiana
Democratic Party members of the United States House of Representatives from Louisiana
Lawyers from New Orleans
19th-century American politicians
19th-century American lawyers